Married Flirts is a 1924 American silent drama film directed by Robert Vignola and starring Pauline Frederick, Mae Busch, and Conrad Nagel. The screenplay, written by Julia Ivers, is based on Louis Joseph Vance's 1923 best seller Mrs. Paramor. The drama was considered quite daring at the time as the story centered on husbands being lured away from their wives. One scene has well known Hollywood stars playing themselves at a party.

Plot
Nellie Wayne (Pauline Frederick) is a novelist who loses her husband to a vamp, who thereupon rejects him to marry another man, who subsequently is enticed away by the novelist.

Cast

Preservation
With no prints of the film located in any film archives, Married Flirts is classified as a lost film. The last known copy of the film was destroyed in the 1965 MGM vault fire.

See also
List of lost films

References

External links

1924 films
1924 drama films
Silent American drama films
American silent feature films
American black-and-white films
Films based on American novels
Films directed by Robert G. Vignola
Lost American films
Metro-Goldwyn-Mayer films
1924 lost films
Lost drama films
1920s American films